Avin-e Masjedlu (also Romanized as Āvīn-e Masjedlū; also known as Āvīn) is a village in Kandovan Rural District, Kandovan District, Meyaneh County, East Azerbaijan Province, Iran. At the 2006 census, its population was 617, in 153 families.

References 

Populated places in Meyaneh County